Sudha Parimala is a Sanskrit work on Dvaita philosophy written by Raghavendra Swami. It is a lucid adaptation of the well-known commentary on Jayatirthas Nyaya Sudha, which is a commentary on Madhvacharya's Anu Vyakhyana.

References

Dvaita Vedanta
Philosophical literature
Sanskrit texts